The following lists events that happened during 1961 in Sierra Leone.

Events

April

 April 27 - Sierra Leone gains its independence from Britain as a Commonwealth realm with Queen Elizabeth II as Queen of Sierra Leone.

References

 
Years of the 20th century in Sierra Leone
1960s in Sierra Leone
Sierra Leone
Sierra Leone